Sandra Isobel McDade (born in February 1964), professionally known as Sandy McDade, is a Scottish actress, known for her part as Margaret Brown (née Ellison) in the television series Lark Rise to Candleford, Miss Scatcherd in the 2011 film Jane Eyre, and Fay on stage at the Royal Court Theatre Downstairs in Iron, which won her the 2003 Evening Standard Theatre Award for Best Actress.

Early life

McDade grew up in Gracemount in Edinburgh, where she attended Gracemount High School. By the age of 15 she obtained a place at the Scottish Youth Theatre, where she made her stage debut at the Royal Lyceum Theatre.

Professional life

McDade's professional acting career has involved acting on television, film and on the stage, although most of her parts have been in supporting rôles. Where she had taken the lead role in Iron, she has won both the 2002 Stage Awards for Acting Excellence and the 2003 Evening Standard Theatre Awards for Best Actress. She would later go on to play her most famous part to date, that of Margaret Brown (née Ellison) in the BBC Television series Lark Rise to Candleford.

Filmography

Television
McDade has been in the cast of some of the most popular British television series, such as Hamish Macbeth, Taggart, A Touch of Frost, The Office, Lark Rise to Candleford and EastEnders

Film

Theatre

Theatre awards and nominations

Radio
 Life: An Audio Tour (BBC Radio 4) (2008)
 Births, Deaths and Marriages (BBC Radio 4) (2012-2013)

See also
List of British actors
List of people from Edinburgh

References

External links
 

Living people
Scottish television actresses
Scottish film actresses
Scottish stage actresses
Actresses from Edinburgh
1964 births